Lincoln Township is one of seventeen rural townships in Black Hawk County, Iowa, United States.  As of the 2000 census, its population was 403.

Geography
According to the USGS, it contains three cemeteries: Blessing, Calvary, and Lincoln. Black Hawk Creek runs through the northwestern corner of the Township

Places in the Township
 Blessing, historical place
 Blessing Cemetery.
 Voorhies, unincorporated village

Major Highways
 U.S. Route 63 runs north–south through the center of the township.
 Iowa Highway 175 enters the township in the southwest corner, runs south of Voorhies and intersections U.S. Route 63

References

External links
 US-Counties.com
 City-Data.com

Townships in Black Hawk County, Iowa
Waterloo – Cedar Falls metropolitan area
Townships in Iowa